Rodney Eade (born 4 April 1958) is a former Australian rules footballer and coach in the Australian Football League. He is a former coach of the Sydney Swans, the Western Bulldogs and the Gold Coast Football Club. He has, to date, coached 377 games of AFL football, placing him first on the all-time AFL/VFL list of most games coached without a premiership.

Playing career

Hawthorn
Recruited from Glenorchy, while still a schoolboy, young Rodney Eade made his VFL debut for the Hawthorn Football Club as an 18-year-old. Playing with a lot of dash and blistering speed, Eade capped off his debut season by playing in the 1976 premiership team. He went on to play in the Hawks‘ 1978, 1983, and 1986 premierships sides.  In all, the winger played 229 games and kicked 46 goals for Hawthorn between 1976 and 1987.

Brisbane Bears
His time at the Hawks finished when he moved to the Brisbane Bears in 1988. Suffering injuries later on as he got older, Eade managed to play 30 games and kicked three goals until his retirement in 1990.

Coaching career
Immediately following his retirement at the end of 1990, Eade took up coaching. In 1991 he was the reserves coach of the Brisbane Bears and led the Bears to the reserves' premiership in that season. He later coached the North Melbourne reserves, and led it to the premiership in 1995. These successes at reserves level gave Eade a strong case for a senior coaching job in 1996.

Sydney Swans
Eade replaced Ron Barassi when he became senior coach of the Sydney Swans in the 1996 season, taking them to the 1996 AFL Grand Final in his first year, in which they lost to North Melbourne by a margin of 43 points. In his second year, in the 1997 season, he took Sydney to sixth on the ladder but they were eliminated in the qualifying finals to the Western Bulldogs. In the 1998 season, he took Sydney to a better performance to third on the ladder where they defeated St Kilda in the qualifying finals before being beaten by Adelaide, the eventual premiers, in the semi finals. In the 1999 season, he took Sydney to eighth spot on the ladder where they were eliminated in the qualifying finals to Essendon by 69 points. In the 2000 season, he took Sydney to eleventh spot on the ladder, missing out in the finals. In the 2001 season, he took Sydney back into the finals finishing with seventh spot on the ladder before being beaten by Hawthorn in the elimination finals. In the 2002 season, with Sydney's record under Eade becoming worse week by week and being placed fourteenth on the ladder, Eade resigned following a narrow Round 12 loss to Geelong; he was replaced by assistant coach Paul Roos as caretaker senior coach for the rest of the 2002 season and Roos was eventually appointed full-time senior coach.

Western Bulldogs
Eade was appointed senior coach of the Western Bulldogs for the 2005 season, when he replaced Peter Rohde who was sacked at the end of the 2004 season. In his first season as Bulldogs senior coach, he took an under-achieving Bulldogs side within a goal of a finals series berth, after they had finished with less than five wins in the previous two years, but just missed out on the finals, finishing in ninth spot on the ladder. In the 2006 season, he took the Bulldogs to a finals series for the first time since Terry Wallace in 2000, where they defeated Collingwood in the elimination finals but lost to eventual premiers West Coast in the semi finals. In the 2007 season, Eade took the Bulldogs to thirteenth on the ladder and, consequently, his job was in jeopardy due to the sudden downturn in the team's performance. But rather than firing him, the club limited his expansive duties.

In the 2008 season, Eade coached the Bulldogs to third on the ladder and then to the club's first preliminary final since 1998, but they were eliminated by Geelong who were the eventual runners-up. In the 2009 season and the 2010 season, Eade took the Bulldogs two more consecutive preliminary finals, falling to St Kilda on both occasions.

The Western Bulldogs under Eade did not progress well in the 2011 season, being placed twelfth on the ladder. Following a big loss to Essendon by 49 points in Round 21, 2011, it was announced on 17 August 2011 that Eade's contract would not be renewed at the conclusion of the 2011 season. The following day, Eade stepped down as senior coach of the Bulldogs. He was replaced by assistant coach Paul Williams as caretaker senior coach for the remainder of the 2011 season.

Collingwood
On 3 October 2011, Eade was appointed by Collingwood to the position of Football and Coaching Strategist, replacing outgoing coach Mick Malthouse, who had originally planned to step into that role after the 2011 season. In September 2013, Eade changed positions when he was appointed to the position of director of football at Collingwood Football Club.

Gold Coast Suns
On 30 October 2014, Eade was appointed the Gold Coast Suns second senior coach, replacing Guy McKenna. 
In the 2015 season, Eade guided the Gold Coast Suns to finish sixteenth on the ladder with four wins and seventeen losses. In the 2016 season, Eade guided the Gold Coast Suns to finish fifteenth on the ladder with six wins and sixteen losses. During the 2017 season, when the Gold Coast Suns under Eade were sitting at fifteenth on the ladder with six wins and thirteen losses after Round 20, 2017, on 8 August 2017, with three games left in the season, Eade was told his contract would not be renewed. Eade departed immediately and was replaced by assistant coach Dean Solomon as caretaker senior coach for the rest of the 2017 season.

Statistics

Playing statistics

|- style="background-color: #EAEAEA"
|style="text-align:center;background:#afe6ba;"|1976†
|style="text-align:center;"|
| 26 || 9 || 4 || 3 || 130 || 28 || 158 || 25 ||  || 0.4 || 0.3 || 14.4 || 3.1 || 17.6 || 2.8 ||  || 0
|-
! scope="row" style="text-align:center" | 1977
|style="text-align:center;"|
| 26 || 22 || 6 || 8 || 248 || 76 || 324 || 45 ||  || 0.3 || 0.4 || 11.3 || 3.5 || 14.7 || 2.0 ||  || 0
|- style="background-color: #EAEAEA"
|style="text-align:center;background:#afe6ba;"|1978†
|style="text-align:center;"|
| 26 || 25 || 5 || 7 || 362 || 86 || 448 || 89 ||  || 0.2 || 0.3 || 14.5 || 3.4 || 17.9 || 3.6 ||  || 2
|-
! scope="row" style="text-align:center" | 1979
|style="text-align:center;"|
| 26 || 21 || 9 || 6 || 317 || 70 || 387 || 48 ||  || 0.4 || 0.3 || 15.1 || 3.3 || 18.4 || 2.3 ||  || 2
|- style="background-color: #EAEAEA"
! scope="row" style="text-align:center" | 1980
|style="text-align:center;"|
| 26 || 20 || 2 || 1 || 305 || 84 || 389 || 99 ||  || 0.1 || 0.1 || 15.3 || 4.2 || 19.5 || 5.0 ||  || 6
|-
! scope="row" style="text-align:center" | 1981
|style="text-align:center;"|
| 26 || 14 || 5 || 4 || 170 || 61 || 231 || 45 ||  || 0.4 || 0.3 || 12.1 || 4.4 || 16.5 || 3.2 ||  || 0
|- style="background-color: #EAEAEA"
! scope="row" style="text-align:center" | 1982
|style="text-align:center;"|
| 26 || 23 || 3 || 5 || 311 || 149 || 460 || 69 ||  || 0.1 || 0.2 || 13.5 || 6.5 || 20.0 || 3.0 ||  || 4
|-
|style="text-align:center;background:#afe6ba;"|1983†
|style="text-align:center;"|
| 26 || 22 || 1 || 3 || 297 || 132 || 429 || 72 ||  || 0.0 || 0.1 || 13.5 || 6.0 || 19.5 || 3.3 ||  || 3
|- style="background-color: #EAEAEA"
! scope="row" style="text-align:center" | 1984
|style="text-align:center;"|
| 26 || 22 || 4 || 6 || 260 || 100 || 360 || 71 ||  || 0.2 || 0.3 || 11.8 || 4.5 || 16.4 || 3.2 ||  || 3
|-
! scope="row" style="text-align:center" | 1985
|style="text-align:center;"|
| 26 || 21 || 5 || 3 || 233 || 88 || 321 || 76 ||  || 0.2 || 0.1 || 11.1 || 4.2 || 15.3 || 3.6 ||  || 3
|- style="background-color: #EAEAEA"
|style="text-align:center;background:#afe6ba;"|1986†
|style="text-align:center;"|
| 26 || 14 || 1 || 2 || 171 || 64 || 235 || 46 ||  || 0.1 || 0.1 || 12.2 || 4.6 || 16.8 || 3.3 ||  || 0
|-
! scope="row" style="text-align:center" | 1987
|style="text-align:center;"|
| 26 || 16 || 1 || 0 || 188 || 74 || 262 || 39 || 24 || 0.1 || 0.0 || 11.8 || 4.6 || 16.4 || 2.4 || 1.5 || 0
|- style="background-color: #EAEAEA"
! scope="row" style="text-align:center" | 1988
|style="text-align:center;"|
| 26 || 13 || 1 || 4 || 178 || 53 || 231 || 62 || 13 || 0.1 || 0.3 || 13.7 || 4.1 || 17.8 || 4.8 || 1.0 || 0
|-
! scope="row" style="text-align:center" | 1989
|style="text-align:center;"|
| 26 || 12 || 1 || 3 || 129 || 37 || 166 || 39 || 21 || 0.1 || 0.3 || 10.8 || 3.1 || 13.8 || 3.3 || 1.8 || 0
|- style="background-color: #EAEAEA"
! scope="row" style="text-align:center" | 1990
|style="text-align:center;"|
| 26 || 5 || 1 || 0 || 68 || 22 || 90 || 19 || 5 || 0.2 || 0.0 || 13.6 || 4.4 || 18.0 || 3.8 || 1.0 || 0
|- class="sortbottom"
! colspan=3| Career
! 259
! 49
! 55
! 3367
! 1124
! 4491
! 844
! 63
! 0.2
! 0.2
! 13.0
! 4.3
! 17.3
! 3.3
! 1.4
! 23
|}

Coaching statistics

|- style="background-color: #EAEAEA"
! scope="row" style="font-weight:normal"|1996
| 
| 25 || 18 || 6 || 1 || 74.0% || 1 || 16
|-
! scope="row" style="font-weight:normal"|1997
| 
| 23 || 12 || 11 || 0 || 52.2% || 6 || 16
|- style="background-color: #EAEAEA"
! scope="row" style="font-weight:normal"|1998
| 
| 24 || 15 || 9 || 0 || 62.5% || 3 || 16
|-
! scope="row" style="font-weight:normal"|1999
| 
| 23 || 11 || 12 || 0 || 47.7% || 8 || 16
|- style="background-color: #EAEAEA"
! scope="row" style="font-weight:normal"|2000
| 
| 22 || 10 || 12 || 0 || 45.5% || 10 || 16
|-
! scope="row" style="font-weight:normal"|2001
| 
| 23 || 12 || 11 || 0 || 52.2% || 7 || 16
|- style="background-color: #EAEAEA"
! scope="row" style="font-weight:normal"|2002
| 
| 12 || 3 || 8 || 1 || 29.2% || 14^ || 16
|-
! scope="row" style="font-weight:normal"|2005
| 
| 22 || 11 || 11 || 0 || 50.0% || 9 || 16
|- style="background-color: #EAEAEA"
! scope="row" style="font-weight:normal"|2006
| 
| 24 || 14 || 10 || 0 || 58.3% || 8 || 16
|-
! scope="row" style="font-weight:normal"|2007
| 
| 22 || 9 || 12 || 1 || 43.2% || 13 || 16
|- style="background-color: #EAEAEA"
! scope="row" style="font-weight:normal"|2008
| 
| 25 || 16 || 8 || 1 || 66.0% || 3 || 16
|-
! scope="row" style="font-weight:normal"|2009
| 
| 25 || 16 || 9 || 0 || 64.0% || 3 || 16
|- style="background-color: #EAEAEA"
! scope="row" style="font-weight:normal"|2010
| 
| 25 || 15 || 10 || 0 || 60.0% || 4 || 16
|-
! scope="row" style="font-weight:normal"|2011
| 
| 19 || 7 || 12 || 0 || 36.8% || 12^ || 17
|- style="background-color: #EAEAEA"
! scope="row" style="font-weight:normal"|2015
| 
| 22 || 4 || 17 || 1 || 20.5% || 16 || 18
|-
! scope="row" style="font-weight:normal"|2016
| 
| 22 || 6 || 16 || 0 || 27.3% || 15 || 18
|- style="background-color: #EAEAEA"
! scope="row" style="font-weight:normal"|2017
| 
| 19 || 6 || 13 || 0 || 31.5% || 15 || 18
|- class="sortbottom"
! colspan=2| Career totals
! 377
! 185
! 187
! 5
! 49.07%
! colspan=2|
|}

^Eade resigned twice mid-season; in 2002, Sydney were fourteenth when he resigned and in 2011, the Western Bulldogs were twelfth when he resigned.

Media career
Eade spent 2003 and 2004 as a media writer and commentator.

Cricketing career
Eade was a talented junior cricketer, making his senior cricketing debut for Glenorchy Cricket Club aged 14. On his debut Eade scored 31*, sharing a match saving partnership with future Australian Test cricketer Roger Woolley.

References

External links

All-Australian coaches
1958 births
Living people
Sydney Swans coaches
Western Bulldogs coaches
Gold Coast Suns coaches
Brisbane Bears players
Hawthorn Football Club players
Hawthorn Football Club Premiership players
Glenorchy Football Club players
Tasmanian State of Origin players
Australian rules footballers from Tasmania
Australia international rules football team coaches
Tasmanian Football Hall of Fame inductees
Four-time VFL/AFL Premiership players